Susanna Salonen is a Finnish-German film director, screenwriter and cinematographer. Born in 1966 in Finland, Salonen grew up in Lübeck and trained as a camerawoman in Berlin. She has shot several award-winning documentaries, and written and directed fiction films. Her fiction debut Patong Girl won the prestigious German Grimme award in 2016. Salonen is a member of the German film academy.

In 2020, she filmed in the central Arctic during the MOSAiC Expedition on German research-icebreaker Polarstern for the international documentary Arctic Drift on climate change research in the Arctic.

References

External links

Film people from Schleswig-Holstein
1966 births
Living people
Finnish emigrants to Germany
People from Lübeck
People from Lahti